The Cape Town Open is a golf tournament on the Sunshine Tour in Cape Town, South Africa.

History
From 2012 to 2016, it was played annually in November at Royal Cape Golf Club. In 2018, it moved to February at the King David Mowbray Golf Club. Rhys Enoch won by one stroke from Peter Karmis. In 2019, the event moved to the Royal Cape Golf Club and was won by Benjamin Follett-Smith.

The 2020 edition was co-sanctioned with the Challenge Tour and had increased prize money of US$250,000 (R3,500,000). Because of the large field, two courses were used for the first two rounds; Royal Cape Golf Club and King David Mowbray Golf Club. Anton Karlsson won by a stroke from Garrick Higgo, with overnight leader Daniel van Tonder fading with a final round 78.

Winners

Notes

References

External links
Coverage at the Sunshine Tour's official website
Coverage at the Challenge Tour's official website

Sunshine Tour events
Golf tournaments in South Africa
Sport in Cape Town